Paul Cranis (born 1935) is an American former professional tennis player.

A left-handed player from New York, Cranis went to high school in Brooklyn and didn't start playing tennis until the late age of 17. He went to George Washington University on a basketball scholarship but left after year.

Cranis, who served two years in the army after college, twice made the singles second round of the U.S. national championships. 

In 1960, Cranis won the Seventh Regiment Armory Invitational, defeating Sidney Schwartz in the quarterfinal and J. Allen Morris in the final. In 1967 he had an upset win over Frank Froehling at a tournament in Southampton, New York.

References

External links
 
 

1935 births
Living people
American male tennis players
Tennis people from New York (state)
George Washington University alumni